Equisetum telmateia, the great horsetail or northern giant horsetail, is a species of Equisetum (puzzlegrass) with an unusual distribution, with one subspecies native to Europe, western Asia and northwest Africa, and a second subspecies native to western North America. The North American subspecies is often simply but ambiguously called "giant horsetail", but that name may just as well refer to the Latin American Equisetum giganteum and Equisetum myriochaetum.

Description
It is an herbaceous perennial plant, with separate green photosynthetic sterile stems, and pale yellowish non-photosynthetic spore-bearing fertile stems. The sterile stems, produced in late spring and dying down in late autumn, are 30–150 cm (rarely to 240 cm) tall (the tallest species of horsetail outside of tropical regions) and 1 cm diameter, heavily branched, with whorls of 14–40 branches, these up to 20 cm long, 1–2 mm diameter and unbranched, emerging from the axils of a ring of bracts. The fertile stems are produced in early spring before the sterile shoots, growing to 15–45 cm tall with an apical spore-bearing strobilus 4–10 cm long and 1–2 cm broad, and no side branches; the spores disperse in mid spring, with the fertile stems dying immediately after spore release. It also spreads by means of rhizomes that have been observed to penetrate 4 meters into wet clay soil, spreading laterally in multiple layers. Occasionally plants produce stems that are both fertile and photosynthetic.

Subspecies
There are two subspecies:
 Equisetum telmateia subsp. telmateia. Great horsetail. Europe, western Asia, northwest Africa. Main stem between branch whorls pale greenish white.
 Equisetum telmateia subsp. braunii (Milde) Hauke. Northern giant horsetail. Western North America, from southeastern Alaska and western British Columbia south to California. Main stem between branch whorls green.

Habitat
It is found in damp shady places, spring fens and seepage lines, usually in open woodlands, commonly forming large clonal colonies.

References

telmateia
Flora of North America
Flora of Europe
Flora of Africa
Plants described in 1783
Taxa named by Jakob Friedrich Ehrhart